Kurt Matthias Robert Martin Hahn  (5 June 1886, Berlin – 14 December 1974, Hermannsberg) was a German educator. He was decisive in founding, among other organizations and initiatives, Stiftung Louisenlund, Schule Schloss Salem, Gordonstoun, Outward Bound, the Duke of Edinburgh's Award, and the first of the United World Colleges, Atlantic College in Wales.

Life

Early life 
Born in Berlin to Jewish parents, Hahn attended school in Berlin, then universities at Oxford, Heidelberg, Freiburg and Göttingen. During World War I, Hahn worked in the German Department for Foreign Affairs, analyzing British newspapers and advising the Foreign Office. He had been private secretary to Prince Max von Baden, the last Imperial Chancellor of Germany, and in 1919 was part of the German delegation to the Paris Peace Conference in 1919, where he witnessed the creation of the Treaty of Versailles, as secretary and speechwriter for the German minister of Foreign Affairs, Graf Brockdorff-Rantzau.

In 1920, Hahn and Prince Max founded Schule Schloss Salem, a private boarding school where Hahn served as headmaster until 1933, and served as the Salem School's headmaster during Adolf Hitler's rise to power. Hahn was raised Jewish, and began his fierce criticism of the Nazi regime after the Potempa murder of 1932, when Hitler's Stormtroopers attacked and killed a young communist in the presence of his mother. The Stormtroopers were originally sentenced to death, but when they were given amnesty and celebrated by the Nazis, Hahn spoke out against Hitler publicly. He asked the students, faculty, and alumni of the Salem school to choose between Salem and Hitler. As a result, he was imprisoned for five days (from 11 to 16 March 1933). After an appeal by British Prime Minister Ramsay MacDonald, Hahn was released, and in July 1933 he was forced to leave Germany and moved to the United Kingdom.

United Kingdom 
Hahn settled in Scotland, where he founded Gordonstoun with Sir Lawrence Holt on similar principles to the school in Salem. Later, Hahn converted to Christianity and became a communicant member of the Church of England in 1945 and preached in the Church of Scotland. He also started an international organisation of schools, now called Round Square. Hahn was also involved in the foundation of the Outward Bound Organisation, Atlantic College in Wales and the wider United World College movement, and the Duke of Edinburgh's Award.

Return to Germany 
After World War II, Hahn divided his time between Britain and Germany. He founded or inspired the founding of several new boarding schools based on the principles of Salem and Gordonstoun: Anavryta, Greece (1949); Louisenlund, Germany (1949); Battisborough, England (1955); Rannoch School, Scotland (1959); Box Hill School, England (1959); International School Ibadan, Nigeria (1963); and The Athenian School, USA (1965).  He resigned from the headship of Gordonstoun on health grounds and returned to Hermannsberg near Salem in 1953. He died there on 14 December 1974 and was buried in Salem.

Philosophy
Hahn's educational philosophy was based on respect for adolescents, whom he believed to possess an innate decency and moral sense, but who were, he believed, corrupted by society as they aged. He believed that education could prevent this corruption, if students were given opportunities for personal leadership and to see the results of their own actions. This is one reason for the focus on outdoor adventure in his philosophy. Hahn relied here on Dr. Bernhard Zimmermann, the former Director of the Göttingen University Physical Education Department, who had to leave Germany in 1938 as he did not want to divorce his Jewish wife. Hahn's educational thinking was crystallised by World War I, which he viewed as proof of the corruption of society and a promise of later doom if people, Europeans particularly, could not be taught differently. At the Schule Schloss Salem, in addition to acting as headmaster, he taught history, politics, ancient Greek, Shakespeare, and Schiller. He was deeply influenced by Plato's thought.
Gordonstoun is based less on Eton than on Salem. Hahn's prefects are called colour bearers, and traditionally they are promoted according to Hahn's values: concern and compassion for others, the willingness to accept responsibility, and concern and tenacity in pursuit of the truth. Punishment of any kind is viewed as a last resort. According to the German educational Michael Knoll, "education for democracy" was at the core of Hahn's educational philosophy.

Hahn also emphasised what he called "Samaritan service", having students give service to others. He formulated this as focusing on finding Christian purpose in life. His former pupil, Golo Mann, later described him as a "Christian gentleman." Hahn's ideas were also adopted — through the efforts of Alec Peterson, who previously worked under Hahn at the newly founded Atlantic College in the 1960s — by the International Baccalaureate program and thus secularised.

Personality
In 1934, through his lectures in London to the New Education Fellowship, Hahn met the educationalist T. C. Worsley and persuaded him to spend a summer term at the newly founded Gordonstoun in the capacity of consultant. In his memoir Flannelled Fool: A Slice of a Life in the Thirties, Worsley records his impressions of Hahn's penetrating character analysis, and his energy and commitment in the cause of human development, but as time went on he became critical of Hahn's "despotic, overpowering personality":
He revealed himself as having a fierce temper, a strong hand with the cane, and a temperament which hated being crossed. Especially damaging to my very English view, was his dislike of being defeated at any game. Hahn was an avid tennis player. But was it an easily forgiveable weakness that his opponents had to be chosen for being his inferiors or else, if their form was unknown, instructed not to let themselves win?

Hahn's behaviour came to seem to Worsley "so ineffably, so Germanically silly" that he was unable to share the clear adulation of the teaching staff:
We were going through the classrooms when, in one, he suddenly stopped, gripped my arm, raised his nostrils in the air, and then, in his marked German accent, he solemnly pronounced:

'Somevon has been talking dirt in this room. I can smell it.'

Hahn's views on Shakespeare led to an open disagreement:
He had what I have since learned to be a common German belief that Shakespeare was better in German than in English. I refused to allow this. I argued that the German translation might indeed be very good, but that the English original must be better. No, he assured me, the German was better; and as I didn't know German and he did know English, he must be right. We grew absurdly heated.

Six Declines of Modern Youth
During his lifetime, Hahn summarised his beliefs about the younger generation at the time into six key points, describing them as the Six Declines of Modern Youth:
 Decline of Fitness due to modern methods of locomotion;
 Decline of Initiative and Enterprise due to the widespread disease of spectatoritis (i.e. "excessive indulgence in forms of amusement in which one is a passive spectator rather than an active participant");
 Decline of Memory and Imagination due to the confused restlessness of modern life;
 Decline of Skill and Care due to the weakened tradition of craftsmanship;
 Decline of Self-discipline due to the ever-present availability of stimulants and tranquillisers;
 Decline of Compassion due to the unseemly haste with which modern life is conducted or, as William Temple called it, "spiritual death".

Hahn also proposed four solutions to these problems, all of which manifested themselves in a variety of ways at Salem, Gordonstoun, Atlantic College, and with Outward Bound:
 Fitness Training (e.g., to compete with oneself in physical fitness; in so doing, train the discipline and determination of the mind through the body);
 Expeditions (e.g., via sea or land, to engage in long, challenging endurance tasks);
 Projects (e.g., involving crafts and manual skills);
 Rescue Service (e.g., surf lifesaving, fire fighting, first aid).

Ten Expeditionary Learning Principles
These 10 principles, which seek to describe a caring, adventurous school culture and approach to learning, were drawn from the ideas of Kurt Hahn and other education leaders for use in Expeditionary Learning Outward Bound (ELOB) schools.

The Kurt Hahn Expeditionary Learning School
In the fall of 2007, The Kurt Hahn Expeditionary Learning School opened in Brooklyn, New York. The school's mission is to prepare informed, skilled, courageous civic leaders, and it is named after Kurt Hahn because he embodied these values.

References

Further reading

 Knoll, Michael (2011). School reform through experiential therapy: Kurt Hahn - an efficious educator.
 Knoll, Michael, ed. (1998). Kurt Hahn: Reform mit Augenmaß. Ausgewählte Schriften eines Politikers und Pädagogen. Stuttgart: Klett-Cotta.
 Veevers, Nick; Pete, Allison (2011). Kurt Hahn: Inspirational, Visionary, Outdoor and Experiential Educator. Rotterdam: Sense Publishers.
 Wilhelm Henze, ed. (1991): Bernhard Zimmermann - Hermann Nohl - Kurt Hahn. Ein Beitrag zur Reformpädagogik. 1991. 
 David Sutcliffe, Kurt Hahn and the United World Colleges with other Founding Figures. 2012.

External links

 KurtHahn.org
 Kurt Hahn Trust
 Outward Bound
 Outward Bound International
 Kurt Hahn - a bibliography

1886 births
1974 deaths
Alumni of Christ Church, Oxford
Heidelberg University alumni
Converts to Protestantism from Judaism
Scottish Jews
Founders of Scottish schools and colleges
German educational theorists
20th-century educational theorists
Outdoor educators
Outward Bound
Jewish emigrants from Nazi Germany to the United Kingdom
Youth empowerment people
Commanders Crosses of the Order of Merit of the Federal Republic of Germany
Commanders of the Order of the British Empire
20th-century British educators
Founders of educational institutions
Founders of British schools and colleges
Founders of schools in the United States
Founders of Nigerian schools and colleges
20th-century German educators
20th-century philanthropists